Carbine Williams is a 1952 American drama film directed by Richard Thorpe and starring James Stewart, Jean Hagen and Wendell Corey. The film follows the life of its namesake, David Marshall Williams, who invented the operating principle for the M1 Carbine while in a North Carolina prison. The M1 Carbine was used extensively by the U.S. military during World War II, the Korean War, and the Vietnam War.

Originally filmed in black-and-white, it is also shown in a computer-colorized version.

Plot 
The film follows the life of David Marshall Williams (James Stewart), who was a member of the Winchester team that invented the semi-automatic M1 Carbine used in World War II. Williams was found distilling illegal moonshine, and was held responsible for the death of a sheriff's deputy during a raid on his still. He was sentenced to thirty years' hard labor. He cycled through the prison system until a firm but compassionate warden, H.T. Peoples (Wendell Corey), allowed him to work in a prison tool shop. There, he invented the gas system for his famous rifle. Williams was released from prison in 1929 and worked with Winchester Firearms on development of the M1 Carbine.

Cast 

 James Stewart as David Marshall 'Marsh' Williams
 Jean Hagen as Maggie Williams
 Wendell Corey as Capt. H. T. Peoples
 Carl Benton Reid as Claude Williams
 Paul Stewart as 'Dutch' Kruger 
 Otto Hulett as Mobley
 Rhys Williams as Redwick Karson
 Herbert Heyes as Lionel Daniels
 James Arness as Leon Williams
 Porter Hall as Sam Markley 
 Fay Roope as District Attorney
 Ralph Dumke as Andrew White
 Leif Erickson as Feder
 Henry Corden as Bill Stockton
 Frank Richards as Truex
 Howard Petrie as Sheriff
 Stuart Randall as Tom Vennar
 Dan Riss as Jesse Rimmer

Reception
According to MGM records the film earned $1,787,000 in the US and Canada and $802,000 elsewhere, resulting in a profit of $575,000.

Comic book adaptation
 Fawcett Movie Comic #19 (October 1952)

References

External links 
 
 
 
 
 

1952 films
1950s biographical drama films
American biographical drama films
American black-and-white films
1950s English-language films
Films directed by Richard Thorpe
Films set in North Carolina
Films set in the 1920s
Metro-Goldwyn-Mayer films
Films adapted into comics
1952 drama films
1950s American films